Mary Mackenzie (3 May 1922 – 20 September 1966) was an English actress. One of her earliest credited TV roles was in 1950 on BBC's Sunday Night Theatre, as Miriam in an adaptation of H. G. Wells' The History of Mr Polly, a role she returned to in the 1959 BBC serialization.

Early and personal life 
Mackenzie was born in Burnley, Lancashire, where she spent her early years. She died at the age of 44 in a car accident in London in 1966.

Acting career

Television
Ghost Squad (1963) as Gertrude in the Episode "Gertrude" (season 2, episode 16)
Z-Cars (1963) as Martha Mather in the Episode "The Listeners" (season 2, episode 22)
The History of Mr Polly (1959) as Miriam
Sunday Night Theatre (1950) as Marjorie Radley in the episode "Miss Hargreaves"
Sunday Night Theatre (1950) as Miriam in the Episode "The History of Mr Polly"

Film
Wanted for Murder (1946) as first victim
Lady in the Fog aka Scotland Yard Inspector (1952) as Marilyn Durant
The Man Who Watched Trains Go By (1952) as Mrs. Lucas
Stolen Face (1952) as Lily Conover, before surgery
The Long Memory (1952) as Gladys
Trouble in the Glen (1954) as Kate Carnoch
 Duel in the Jungle (1954) as junior secretary
The Harassed Hero (1954) as Estelle Logan
Cloak Without Dagger (1956) as Kyra Gabaine
Yield to the Night (1956) as Matron
A Question of Adultery (1958) as Nurse Parsons
The Man Who Liked Funerals (1959) as Hester Waring

References

External links
 

1922 births
1966 deaths
English television actresses
People from Burnley
English film actresses
Actresses from Lancashire
Road incident deaths in London
20th-century English actresses